Shchuchyn District is a district (rajon) in Grodno Region,  Belarus.

The administrative center is Shchuchyn.

Notable residents 
 Vaclaŭ Ivanoŭski (also known as Vatslaw Ivanowski or Wacław Iwanowski) (1880 - 1943), Belarusian political and public figure of the first half of the 20th century
 Alaiza Pashkevich (pen name Ciotka) (1876 – 1916), Belarusian poet and political activist of the Belarusian national movement

References

 
Districts of Grodno Region